The 2012–13 EHF Women's Champions League knockout stage ran from 6 April to 13 April 2013. The top two placed teams from the main round advanced to the semifinals.

Semifinals

|}

First leg

Second leg

Győri ETO won 48–47 on aggregate.

Larvik won 49–43 on aggregate.

Final
A draw on 11 April 2013, decided which team had homecourt in the first leg.

|}

First leg

Second leg

References

External links
EHF Site

2012–13 Women's EHF Champions League